Frank Arthur Calder,  (August 3, 1915 – November 4, 2006) was a Nisga'a politician in Canada.

Born in Nass Harbour, British Columbia, Calder was the first indigenous person to graduate from the Anglican Theological College of the University of British Columbia. Mr. Calder was an hereditary chief of the House of Wisinxbiltkw from the Killerwhale Tribe. He died November 4, 2006 at an assisted-living home in Victoria from the effects of cancer and recent abdominal surgery.

Political career

In the 1949 British Columbia election, Calder was elected to the Legislative Assembly of British Columbia. He was elected in the riding of Atlin  where he continued to serve until 1979. Calder represented BC's Co-operative Commonwealth Federation (which later became the New Democratic Party of British Columbia).

Calder was appointed cabinet member in Dave Barrett's government in 1972 and became BC's first aboriginal cabinet minister. In 1973, police found him in a consensual situation involving a female companion, alcohol and a car parked in an intersection. He was arrested but not charged and was fired from cabinet. In 1974 he was defeated by Joseph Gosnell in his bid to be re-elected as president of the Nisga'a Tribal Council.

In 1975, Calder crossed the floor to join the Social Credit Party of British Columbia and was re-elected. In 1979, however, Calder lost his seat to the NDP candidate, Al Passarell, by a single vote. Calder and his wife had both neglected to vote.

Fighting for treaty rights

Calder is famous for the court case titled "Calder vs. Attorney General of British Columbia", which was argued by Thomas Berger. By appealing the case all the way to the Supreme Court of Canada, Calder established that Aboriginal title exists in modern Canadian law. This decision had national and international reverberations. In addition, it was the basis of BC's Nisga'a treaty.

Before the Calder Case, there was no clear process for negotiating Canadian land claim settlements. Calder clarified which lands were negotiable (40% of Canada's land mass) and which were not. After the case, Canada developed a land claim policy to guide negotiations. He continued to fight for Nisga'a's treaty rights as recently as 2000.

Calder founded the Nisga'a Tribal Council, the first tribal council established in BC. Calder was its president for 21 years until 1974.

Honours
 1987 - Made an Officer of the Order of Canada.
 Awarded the Aboriginal Order of Canada.
 1996 - National Aboriginal Achievement Award 
 2004 - Awarded the Order of British Columbia.

References

External links
 In memory of Dr. Frank Calder, Chief of Chiefs
 Eulogy from the Diocese of New Westminster web pages
 Introduction by Frank Calder to Nisga'a: People Of The Nass River
 Calder's Order of British Columbia biography
 Calder in the Canadian Encyclopedia
  
 Provincial Hansard during debate on circumstances of Calder's firing

1915 births
2006 deaths
20th-century Canadian legislators
20th-century First Nations people
21st-century First Nations people
British Columbia Co-operative Commonwealth Federation MLAs
British Columbia New Democratic Party MLAs
British Columbia Social Credit Party MLAs
Canadian Anglicans
Deaths from cancer in British Columbia
First Nations politicians
Indigenous leaders in British Columbia
Indspire Awards
Members of the Executive Council of British Columbia
Members of the Order of British Columbia
Nisga'a people
Officers of the Order of Canada
People from the Regional District of Kitimat–Stikine
University of British Columbia alumni